The 1998 Gold Flake Open was an ATP men's tennis tournament held in Chennai, India that was part of the World Series of the 1998 ATP Tour. It was the third edition of the tournament and was held on outdoor hard courts from 6 April to 13 April 1998. First-seeded Patrick Rafter won the singles title.

Finals

Singles

 Patrick Rafter defeated  Mikael Tillström 6–3, 6–4
 It was Rafter's 1st singles title of the year and the 3rd of his career.

Doubles

 Leander Paes /  Mahesh Bhupathi defeated  Olivier Delaître /  Max Mirnyi 6–7, 6–3, 6–2
 It was Paes's 3rd title of the year and the 9th of his career. It was Bhupathi's 3rd title of the year and the 9th of his career.

References

External links
 ITF tournament edition details

 

 
Chennai Open
Chennai Open
Chennai Open